Pterophylla is a genus of true katydids in the family Tettigoniidae. There are about five described species in Pterophylla.

Within the Pseudophyllinae, Pterophylla belongs to the tribe Pterophyllini. Among others, this tribe includes the Florida true katydid Lea floridensis, as well as the two Southwestern true katydid species in the genus Paracyrtophyllus.

Species
The genus Pterophylla comprises five species, three of which were discovered in Mexico. Aside from the present species, only one other, Pterophylla furcata, is to be found in the central United States.  The following species are included:
subgenus Balsasia Bolívar & Bolívar, 1942
 Pterophylla baezi Bolívar & Bolívar, 1942
subgenus Pterophylla Kirby, 1825
 Pterophylla beltrani Bolívar & Bolívar, 1942
 Pterophylla camellifolia (Fabricius, 1775) (common true katydid)
 Pterophylla furcata Caudell, 1906
 Pterophylla robertsi Hebard, 1941

References

Further reading

External links
 

Pseudophyllinae
Tettigoniidae genera
Orthoptera of North America